Elections to Epping Forest Council were held on 6 May 1999.  One third of the council was up for election and the council stayed under no overall control. Overall turnout was 29%. This was the last time the Epping Residents Association had representation on the district council.

By-elections

Sheering by-election

Councillor Yeo who previously represented Sheering died in early 1999 prompting a by-election which was subsequently won by the Conservatives' John Harrington who completed Yeo's term until being elected to a full term in 2000.

Results

Broadway

Buckhurst Hill East

Buckhurst Hill West

Chipping Ongar

Debden Green

Epping Hemnall

Epping Lindsey

Grange Hill

Greensted and Marden Ash

High Beech

Lambourne

Loughton Roding

Loughton St. John's

Moreton and Matching

Nazeing

North Weald Bassett

Shelley

Waltham Abbey East

Waltham Abbey Paternoster

Waltham Abbey West

References
1999 Epping Forest election result
Ward results

1999
1999 English local elections
1990s in Essex